Eleven West is a 24-story building under construction in Portland, Oregon, United States. The building will feature 110,000 square feet of office space, 225 apartments, retail on the street level, and underground parking.

The building is expected to block Rone's 2013 mural Every Rose Has its Thorn, but not Capax Infiniti.

See also

 List of tallest buildings in Portland, Oregon
 Twelve West

References

Buildings and structures in Portland, Oregon
Buildings and structures under construction in the United States